The Hatchetigbee Bluff Formation is a geologic formation in Alabama, Georgia, Louisiana and Mississippi. The youngest unit of the Wilcox Group preserves fossils dating back to the Ypresian stage of the Eocene period, or Wasatchian in the NALMA classification. The formation is named for Hatchetigbee Bluff on the Tombigbee River, Washington County, Alabama.

Wasatchian correlations

See also 

 List of fossiliferous stratigraphic units in Alabama
 List of fossiliferous stratigraphic units in Georgia (U.S. state)
 List of fossiliferous stratigraphic units in Louisiana
 List of fossiliferous stratigraphic units in Mississippi
 Paleontology in Alabama
 Paleontology in Georgia (U.S. state)
 Paleontology in Louisiana
 Paleontology in Mississippi

References

Bibliography

Further reading 
 Smith, E.A., and Johnson, L.C., 1887, Tertiary and Cretaceous strata of the Tuscaloosa, Tombigbee, and Alabama Rivers: U.S. Geological Survey Bulletin, 43, 189 p.

Geologic formations of Alabama
Geologic formations of Georgia (U.S. state)
Geologic formations of Louisiana
Geologic formations of Mississippi
Eocene Series of North America
Paleogene Alabama
Paleogene Georgia (U.S. state)
Paleogene Louisiana
Paleogene Mississippi
Ypresian Stage
Wasatchian
Limestone formations
Sandstone formations of the United States
Shale formations of the United States
Siltstone formations
Shallow marine deposits
Paleontology in Alabama
Paleontology in Georgia (U.S. state)
Paleontology in Louisiana
Paleontology in Mississippi